McCrory Stores or J.G. McCrory's was a chain of five and dime stores in the United States based in York, Pennsylvania.  The stores typically sold shoes, clothing, housewares, fabrics, penny candy, toys, cosmetics, and often included a lunch counter or snack bar. They also exclusively sold Oriole Records, one of the most popular 'dime store labels' from 1921 to 1938.

Founding 

John Graham McCrorey (1860-1923) opened his first store in Scottdale, Pennsylvania, in 1882. By 1885, the chain had five stores in Pennsylvania. McCrory was known for his thrifty nature, so much so that he legally dropped the e from his last name so he would not have to pay for extra letters on his store signs.

One of the firm's policies was to acquire locations whenever property could be found at a reasonable purchase price. In November 1925, approximately ⅔ of its stores were leased, with the remainder owned by a subsidiary, the McCrory Realty Corporation. The retailer's gross sales approached $30 million by the mid-1920s, when it operated 187 stores.

With 244 retail units in its chain, the company entered bankruptcy in January 1933. The company was dissolved, but it was eventually re-established as McCrory Stores and resumed operations. One of the early investors was Sebastian Spering Kresge, who later founded the S.S. Kresge chain, which became Kmart.  In 1899, Kresge traded his interest in the McCrory's Memphis, Tennessee store for McCrory's interest in the Detroit, Michigan, store, giving him control there. In 1987, the Kmart Corporation sold its remaining Kresge and Jupiter stores in the United States to McCrory Stores.

History 

At its height, McCrory's operated 1,300 stores under its own name and as TG&Y, McLellan (merged in 1958), H. L. Green, Silvers, G.C. Murphy, J.J. Newberry and Otasco, which it had acquired through the years. McCrory's parent Rapid-American also owned Lerner Stores and National Shirt (acquired by McCrory's in 1960).

Meshulam Riklis purchased McCrory in 1960 and merged it with the rival H.L.Green Co. and moved its headquarters to Springettsbury Township, York County, Pennsylvania, in 1963. At the time it was the fourth largest retailer in the United States. Riklis controlled McCrory's through the Rapid-American holding company, which was managed by Samuel Neaman.  Riklis' famed sleight of hand, shifting assets between notable brand name successful companies and holding companies is best exemplified by his handling of McCrory Stores, driving the brand name into bankruptcy while keeping the assets.  Among the retailers controlled by McCrory's at the time were Best & Co., Lerner Shops, and S. Klein.

The company continued to thrive and grow during the 1960s and '70s.  McCrory Stores purchased the 439 unit J.J. Newberry Company in 1972.  It operated Newberry as a separate division and continued to open stores under the Newberry banner.

On January 1, 1981, McCrory purchased the S.H. Kress & Co. chain from Genesco.  The 66 store chain, once a fierce rival, was a natural fit for the variety store chain.

As the economic expansion of the 1980s progressed, so did the successes of McCrory.  They continued to expand and remodel stores as volume and profits grew exponentially.

McCrory purchased the Oklahoma-based TG&Y Discount store chain in 1985.  This proved to be a difficult transition for the company as the discount chain was not a natural fit for McCrory.  Many of the stores were beyond the typical 10-15K Sq. Ft. footprint that the company operated in and the merchandise mix was very different.  The TG&Y stores were not profitable and drained McCrory of valuable assets.  Many of the TG&Y stores were converted to the Bargain Time banner that McCrory operated and were closed as the 1980s came to an end.

In 1987, McCrory Stores purchased the 76 remaining Kresge and Jupiter stores from the K Mart Corporation which had long given up on the variety stores division, reuniting the companies.  All stores were converted to the McCrory banner.

In 1989, McCrory Stores purchased the GC Murphy Co. from Ames Stores.  The sale included the remaining GC Murphy Stores and Bargain World Stores as well.

Decline 
In 1989, 1,300 stores were operated by the McCrory company. However, as the decade turned, its fortunes decreased, and by 1992 it filed for bankruptcy. The changing retail landscape including the migrating of shoppers from the inner cities to the influx of superstores such as Target and Wal-Mart sealed the fate of the once mighty Five And Ten. Several rounds of store closures followed, with one of the biggest coming in 1997 when McCrory's shuttered 300 of its last 460 stores. The company also converted some stores to their Dollar Zone format of dollar store, but these closed in early 2002.  In December 2001, McCrory Stores announced the remaining McCrory's, TG&Y, G. C. Murphy and J.J. Newberry stores it was operating would begin liquidating and in February 2002 the company ceased operation.

References 

 Isadore Barmash (1976). For the Good of the Company: The History of the McCrory Corporation. .

 
Five and dimes
Defunct discount stores of the United States
Companies based in York County, Pennsylvania
Springettsbury Township, York County, Pennsylvania
York, Pennsylvania
American companies established in 1882
Retail companies established in 1882
Retail companies disestablished in 2001
1882 establishments in Pennsylvania
2001 disestablishments in Pennsylvania
Companies that have filed for Chapter 7 bankruptcy
Companies that filed for Chapter 11 bankruptcy in 1933
Companies that filed for Chapter 11 bankruptcy in 1992